16-Methoxytabersonine is a terpene indole alkaloid produced by the medicinal plant Catharanthus roseus.  16-methoxytabersonine is synthesized by methylation of the hydroxyl group at the 16 position of 16-hydroxytabersonine by tabersonine 16-O-methyltransferase (16OMT).  The compound is a substrate for hydration by two concerted enzymes Tabersonine-3-Oxidase (T3O) and Tabersonine-3-Reductase (T3R), which leads to the formation of 3-hydroxy-16-methoxy-2,3-dihydrotabersonine.

References

Indole alkaloids